Robert Irvine is a celebrity chef.

Robert Irvine may also refer to:
Bobby Irvine (footballer, born 1900) (1900–1979), Irish football (soccer) forward
Bobby Irvine (footballer, born 1942), Irish football (soccer) goalkeeper
Bulldog Irvine (1853–1897), Scottish rugby player
Robert Irvine (rugby league), New Zealand rugby league footballer of the 1910s
Robert Irvine (soccer) (born 1974), Canadian soccer player

See also
Bob Irvin, American politician
Robert Irving (disambiguation)
Robert Irwin (disambiguation)